The Trixie & Katya Show is an American comedy television series featuring drag queens Trixie Mattel and Katya Zamolodchikova, who both rose to prominence competing on the seventh season of RuPaul's Drag Race. The show is a spin-off of the YouTube series UNHhhh, which turned both Trixie and Katya into "viral internet stars".

Production
Ahead of its premiere on November 15, 2017, Viceland and World of Wonder made the show's first episode available online on November 3.

Fill-in
Bob the Drag Queen appeared as a guest host in Katya's place for the final five episodes, after Katya announced a hiatus from drag to seek treatment after relapsing into the use of methamphetamine. The day after the season's finale, Katya tweeted her thanks to Bob for filling in for her while she recovered.

Episodes

Season 1 (2017–18)

Reception
The A.V. Club gave the series an A− in a review based on the first three episodes of season one.

See also
List of comedy and variety television programs with LGBT cast members
List of programs broadcast by Viceland

References

External links
 
 
 The Trixie & Katya Show episode list at TV Guide

2010s American LGBT-related comedy television series
2017 American television series debuts
American television spin-offs
English-language television shows
Viceland original programming
Drag (clothing) television shows